Misterio (Mystery) is a 1980 Mexican thriller film, directed and written by Marcela Fernández Violante. The film stars Juan Ferrara, as a TV star who blurs reality with the plot of the soap opera he is shooting. Helena Rojo plays Sandra, his co-star, while Víctor Junco is the TV director and Beatríz Sheridan is the screenwriter. Misterio is adapted from a novel written by Vicente Leñero, who adapted it for the screen. The film received eight Ariel Awards in 1980, including Best Actor (Ferrara), Best Actress (Rojo), Best Supporting Actor (Junco), and Best Supporting Actress (Sheridan).

Cast
Juan Ferrara as Alex
Helena Rojo as Silvia
Víctor Junco as soap opera director
Beatriz Sheridan as Gladys
Ramón Menéndez as camera director
Jorge Fegán as executive producer
Leticia Perdigón as María Luisa

Awards

Ariel Awards
The Ariel Awards are awarded annually by the Mexican Academy of Film Arts and Sciences in Mexico. Misterio received eight awards out of 12 nominations.

|-
|rowspan="13" scope="row"| 23rd Ariel Awards
|-
|scope="row"| Marcela Fernández Violante
|scope="row"| Best Direction
| 
|-
|scope="row"| Juan Ferrara
|rowspan="1" scope="row"| Best Actor
| 
|-
|scope="row"| Helena Rojo
|rowspan="1" scope="row"| Best Actress
| 
|-
|scope="row"| Víctor Junco
|rowspan="1" scope="row"| Best Supporting Actor
| 
|-
|scope="row"| Beatriz Sheridan
|rowspan="1" scope="row"| Best Supporting Actress
| 
|-
|rowspan="2" scope="row"| Vicente Leñero
|rowspan="1" scope="row"| Best Screenplay
| 
|-
|scope="row"| Best Original Story
| 
|-
|scope="row"| Daniel López
|rowspan="1" scope="row"| Best Cinematography
| 
|-
|scope="row"| Jorge Bustos
|rowspan="1" scope="row"| Best Editing
| 
|-
|scope="row"| Leonardo Velázquez
|rowspan="1" scope="row"| Best Original Score
| 
|-
|scope="row"| Rafael Suárez
|rowspan="1" scope="row"| Best Art Direction
| 
|-
|scope="row"| Xavier Rodríguez
|rowspan="1" scope="row"| Best Set Decoration
| 
|-

External links

References

1980 films
1980s thriller drama films
Mexican thriller drama films
1980s Spanish-language films
1980 drama films
1980s Mexican films